Robert K. Tanenbaum is an American trial attorney, novelist, and former mayor of Beverly Hills, California.

Early life and education
Robert K. Tanenbaum, born in Brooklyn, New York, attended the University of California, Berkeley on a basketball scholarship where he earned a B.A. He received his J.D. from Boalt Hall School of Law at the University of California, Berkeley.

Legal career
It was under the leadership of District Attorney Frank Hogan where Tanenbaum learned about trial preparedness and presenting evidence to a jury as an Assistant New York County District Attorney in Manhattan. Later, Tanenbaum became head of the Homicide Bureau, served as Chief of the Criminal Courts, and was in charge of the D.A.'s legal staff training program. During his time in the D.A.'s office, Robert K. Tanenbaum never lost a felony case.

After his tenure in Manhattan's D.A.'s office, Robert K. Tanenbaum served as Deputy Chief Counsel for the House Select Committee on Assassinations to investigate the John F. Kennedy assassination and the Martin Luther King, Jr. assassination. Tanenbaum subsequently resigned from the post shortly after being named. In 1988 he appeared in the documentary The Men Who Killed Kennedy.

In private practice, notably, he was a special prosecution consultant on the Hillside Strangler case in Los Angeles; defended Amy Grossberg in her sensationalized baby death case; and represented eight black plaintiffs in a significant racial profiling case against the Beverly Hills Police Department.
 
He taught Advanced Criminal Procedure for four years at Boalt Hall School of Law at the University of California, Berkeley. He conducts continuing legal education seminars for practicing lawyers in California, New York and Pennsylvania. He is a member of the State Bars of New York, Pennsylvania and California.

Political career
Robert K. Tanenbaum served two terms as Mayor of Beverly Hills and was a City Council Member for eight years, from 1986 to 1994.  He ran unsuccessfully for Los Angeles County District Attorney in 1992. He was defeated for re-election to the City Council in 1994. He also ran D.A. Frank Hogan's re-election campaign for District Attorney in 1973.

Literary career
Robert K. Tanenbaum's byline appears on 32 books; 29 novels and 3 nonfiction works. His cousin Michael Gruber was the ghostwriter of the first part of the popular Butch Karp -Marlene Ciampi series of novels, starting with No Lesser Plea and ending with Resolved. After the partnership with Tanenbaum ended, Gruber began publishing novels using his own name.

Tanenbaum's The Piano Teacher , co-written with Peter S. Greenberg, is the true story of a psychotic killer, Badge of the Assassin recalls the true account of Tanenbaum's investigation and trial of self-proclaimed members of the Black Liberation Army who assassinated two NYPD police officers, Waverly Jones and Joseph Piagentini. It was later adapted into a movie titled Badge of the Assassin, starring James Woods as Tanenbaum.

Tanenbaum's signature work, Echoes of My Soul was published in May 2013 by Kensington Books and was named 'Pick of the Week' by Publishers Weekly in its April 22, 2013 edition. It is about Miranda v. Arizona, the United States Supreme Court decision that laid the groundwork for Miranda rights.

His latest novel, Without Fear or Favor, was published by Simon & Schuster Gallery Books in August 2017.

Bibliography

Non-fiction
 1987: The Piano Teacher: The True Story of a Psychotic Killer
 1979: Badge of the Assassin (1985 TV film adaption Badge of the Assassin)
 2013: Echoes of My Soul

Fiction
 1987: No Lesser Plea 
 1989: Depraved Indifference
 1991: Immoral Certainty
 1992: Reversible Error
 1993: Material Witness
 1994: Justice Denied
 1994: Corruption of Blood
 1996: Falsely Accused
 1997: Irresistible Impulse
 1998: Reckless Endangerment
 1999: Act of Revenge
 2000: True Justice
 2001: Enemy Within
 2002: Absolute Rage
 2003: Resolved
 2004: Hoax
 2005: Fury
 2006: Counterplay
 2007: Malice
 2008: Escape
 2009: Capture
 2010: Betrayed
 2011: Outrage
 2012: Bad Faith
 2013: Tragic
 2014: Fatal Conceit
 2015: Trap
 2016: Infamy
 2017: Without Fear or Favor

References

External links
  robertktanenbaumbooks.com
 Interview with Len Osanic on Black Op Radio (Ep. 731).

Living people
UC Berkeley School of Law alumni
American crime fiction writers
Mayors of Beverly Hills, California
American male novelists
20th-century American novelists
20th-century American lawyers
21st-century American novelists
University of California, Berkeley alumni
Writers from Brooklyn
California city council members
UC Berkeley School of Law faculty
20th-century American male writers
21st-century American male writers
Novelists from New York (state)
1942 births